The All-Ireland Senior B Hurling Championship of 1990 was the 17th staging of Ireland's secondary hurling knock-out competition.  London won the championship, beating Kildare 1-15 to 5-2 in the final at the Emerald GAA Grounds, Ruislip.

References

 Donegan, Des, The Complete Handbook of Gaelic Games (DBA Publications Limited, 2005).

1990
B